Howard "Howie" Johnson (September 8, 1925 – September 13, 2015) was an American professional golfer who played on the PGA Tour and the Senior PGA Tour.

Born in Saint Paul, Minnesota, Johnson played college golf at the University of Minnesota, where he was team captain. He did not turn professional until age 30, and then only on a dare.

Johnson joined the PGA Tour in 1956 and had two victories. He won his first tour event in 1958 at the Azalea Open, in a playoff with Arnold Palmer. His best finish in a major was T-12 at the U.S. Open in 1970.

Johnson joined the Senior PGA Tour in 1980 and his best finish was a T-2 at the Vintage Chrysler Invitational in 1987. He lived in Rancho Mirage, California, and his son, Howard Johnson, Jr., played on the Nationwide Tour.

Johnson died in September 2015 at the age of 90.

Professional wins (3)

PGA Tour wins (2)

PGA Tour playoff record (1–1)

Other wins (1)
1960 Mexican Open

References

External links

American male golfers
Minnesota Golden Gophers men's golfers
PGA Tour golfers
PGA Tour Champions golfers
Golfers from Minnesota
Golfers from California
Sportspeople from Saint Paul, Minnesota
Sportspeople from Riverside County, California
1925 births
2015 deaths